Russell Coleman is the former United States Attorney for the Western District of Kentucky. 
On September 22, 2017, following nomination by President Donald Trump and unanimous confirmation by the U.S. Senate, Coleman was sworn-in as United States Attorney. He resigned on January 20, 2021. In May 2022, Coleman launched a campaign for Kentucky Attorney General.

Early life and career

Coleman grew up in rural western Kentucky, having been raised in Graves, Daviess and Logan Counties, and graduated from Logan County High School. He received both his undergraduate and law degrees from the University of Kentucky.

Coleman previously served as a Special Agent with the Federal Bureau of Investigation, as legal counsel to United States Senator Mitch McConnell, and as the Briefing Coordinator to two U.S. Attorney's General at the U.S. Department of Justice.

He practiced law in Louisville as a partner at Frost Brown Todd from 2015 to 2017 and served as an Assistant Commonwealth's Attorney for Kentucky's 12th Judicial Circuit.

Coleman served as Vice Chair of the Law Enforcement Coordination & Relations Subcommittee of the Attorney General's Advisory Committee (AGAC) and a member of the AGAC's Heroin and Opiate Working Group. Coleman also served on the Executive Board of the Appalachia High Intensity Drug Trafficking Area (HIDTA).

U.S. Attorney
The Western District of Kentucky encompasses 53 counties with a population of more than 2.2 million, includes two military installations and federal courthouses in Louisville, Bowling Green, Paducah, and Owensboro. The Office is responsible for prosecuting violations of federal law, to include crimes related to firearms, narcotics, public corruption, child exploitation, wire and bank fraud, and terrorism. The office also defends the United States in civil cases.

In February 2019, Coleman penned a guest column for The Courier-Journal reflecting on the opioid crisis and his firsthand experience viewing an autopsy of a suspected overdose victim. Coleman wrote "I recognize that we will not be able to arrest our way out of the drug crisis. But it is equally true that prevention and treatment alone cannot solve the crisis." 

Coleman published a second guest column in The Courier-Journal in July 2019. As the homicide rate in Louisville began to increase, he declared Louisville had a violent crime problem. Coleman promised "a more muscular and visible response by federal law enforcement" but said "arresting our way out of this problem is not, alone, a long-term solution. He cited "historic racism that imposed shameful inequities and structural barriers to inherited wealth and opportunity" as issues to be addressed.

Pegasus Institute co-founder Jordan Harris called Coleman "the best prosecutor in America," writing that as U.S. Attorney Coleman has gained "unparalleled reverence among law enforcement officials and unparalleled fear among law breakers."

In late 2019, Coleman completed meetings with law enforcement and business leaders in all 53 counties of the Western District of Kentucky. The visits, a first for a sitting U.S. Attorney, culminated with guest columns in multiple Kentucky news outlets including the Courier-Journal and in Kentucky Today, declaring "all Kentucky families deserve protecting." "

Coleman was appointed to President Donald Trump's Commission on Law Enforcement and the Administration of Justice Law Enforcement Recruitment and Training Working Group in February of 2020. According to a press release from the Department of Justice, the Working Group will hear from experts and practitioners with firsthand experience within law enforcement about best practices, challenges, and innovative strategies to address and enhance law enforcement operations and processes, including the recruitment and training of law enforcement. WLKY-TV in Louisville covered Coleman's appointment to the commission  and his promise that Kentucky voices will be heard.

As protests, riots, and looting struck Louisville in early June of 2020, Coleman penned an op-ed promising a joint response from federal law enforcement in regards to looting. He promised to protect the rights of protestors and tackle the criminals who used the protests as an opportunity to destroy the community, saying "two groups have emerged: one group, the majority of protesters, are forcefully and peacefully demanding that their voices be heard. A second smaller group consists of criminals using the cover of the protests to burglarize drug stores for their controlled substances and gun shops, loot almost half a dozen ATMs, carjack vehicles and shoot at police. This is violence and mayhem, not constitutionally protected protest." By mid-June multiple people were charged federally including multiple defendants who allegedly robbed a pharmacy, one for carjacking, and at least two others who were convicted felons with firearms."

On January 11, 2021, Coleman announced his resignation effective January 20, 2021.

2023 Kentucky Attorney General campaign
On May 12, 2022, Coleman launched a campaign for Kentucky Attorney General as a Republican. At his announcement, Coleman received “more than 50 endorsements from prosecutors, law enforcement officials and public figures, including former President Trump’s drug czar, James W. Carroll, former Kentucky Commerce Secretary Jim Host and Louisville Metro Council Member Anthony Piagentini.”

References

External links
 Biography at Department of Justice

Living people
University of Kentucky alumni
University of Kentucky College of Law alumni
21st-century American lawyers
Federal Bureau of Investigation agents
Kentucky lawyers
Kentucky Republicans
United States Attorneys for the Western District of Kentucky
Year of birth missing (living people)